Güroymak (from , Norshen) is a town in Bitlis Province, Turkey. It is the seat of Güroymak District. Its population is 25,724 (2021). The current mayor is Hikmet Taşdemir (HDP).

References 

Populated places in Bitlis Province
Güroymak District
Towns in Turkey
Kurdish settlements in Turkey